Huizhou station is located in China , Guangdong Province, Huizhou City Huicheng District Xiaojinkou street Wushi, formerly known as Huizhou North Station , opened in 1990, belongs to China Guangzhou Railway Bureau Group under the jurisdiction of Huizhou Service Depot a station, railway through the Beijing-Kowloon Railway .

History

 1990: Huizhou North Station was completed and opened, and it was a fourth-class station.
 On January 10, 2003, the Beijing-Kowloon Railway double line opened to traffic, and the new station building of Huizhou North Station was officially opened. On June 1 of the same year, it was renamed Huizhou Station and the original Huizhou Station was renamed Huizhou West Station.
 On June 27, 2020, the improvement project of the passenger transportation facilities of Huizhou Station officially started, including raising the platform, adding a pedestrian bridge across the platform, and adding an escalator and elevator to the station building. The improvement project was completed in December of the same year and officially opened on January 10, 2021

Usage
Huizhou Station is the station of Beijing-Kowloon Railway. About 50 passenger trains are handled daily.

References

Stations on the Beijing–Kowloon Railway
Railway stations in Guangdong
Buildings and structures in Huizhou